Lysine-specific demethylase 6A also known as Ubiquitously transcribed tetratricopeptide repeat, X chromosome (UTX), is a protein which in humans is encoded by the KDM6A gene. It belongs to the 2-oxoglutarate (2OG)-dependent dioxygenase superfamily.

Function 

UTX has been linked with demethylation of lysine residues on histone, in particular H3K27, resulting in a gene de-repression, a potential means of regulating cellular metabolism.

References

Further reading

Human 2OG oxygenases
EC 1.14.11